Heavy Mechanical Complex Ltd (HMC) is a Pakistani state-owned defense manufacturer, a subsidiary of State Engineering Corporation (SEC), Ministry of Industries & Production, Government of Pakistan. 

It is located in Taxila, Rawalpindi District, Pakistan.

It was established in 1979 with Chinese assistance.

It manufactures equipment for hydro-electric power plants, thermal power plants, sulphuric acid plants, industrial alcohol plants, oil and gas processing plants, and chemical and petro-chemical plants. Boilers, cranes, construction machinery, material handling equipment, steel structure,  sugar mills, cement plants and railway equipment are the other products which are produced there.

References

Government-owned companies of Pakistan
Pakistani companies established in 1979
Manufacturing companies established in 1979
China–Pakistan relations
Companies based in Rawalpindi
Defence companies of Pakistan
Weapons manufacturing companies